Nabis capsiformis, the pale damsel bug, is a species of damsel bug in the family Nabidae. It is found in Africa, the Caribbean, Europe and Northern Asia (excluding China), Central America, North America, Oceania, and South America.

References

Further reading

External links

Nabidae
Articles created by Qbugbot
Insects described in 1838